Beaufort Island is a member of the Po Toi group of islands in Hong Kong.

Ecology
According to the local government, several plant species of conservation concern are present on Beaufort Island such as Eulophia flava ( 黃花美冠蘭 ), Podocarpus macrophyllus (羅漢松), Polygala polifolia (小花遠志) and Rungia chinensis (中華孩兒草).

Geology 
The 140-million-year-old Po Toi Granite, which forms nearly all of Beaufort Island, is the last large magma intrusion in Hong Kong. Megacrysts are commonly found.

See also

 Waglan Island
 Po Toi Island

References 

Uninhabited islands of Hong Kong
Po Toi Islands
Islands of Hong Kong